Ride Him, Bosko! released in 1932, is a Western animated  short film in Warner Bros.' Looney Tunes series. It features Bosko, Warner Bros.' first cartoon character and his sweetheart Honey in the Old West.

Plot
The cartoon begins as a coyote howls from a mountain top, under a full moon. He takes a deep breath as his body inflates to accommodate extra air and releases another howl.

Next, Bosko is seen riding a horse, playing a banjo and singing the cowboy song, "When the Bloom is on the Sage". His horse seems unable to go over a rock along their path and Bosko is forced to climb down and push him over it before they can continue on their way.

The scene then shows the following words against a black background as the music switches to a piano rendition of "She'll Be Coming 'Round the Mountain".

Red Gulch
~ where men are men,
         nine times out of ten ~

The view is next of a road outside a saloon and shadows in the window indicate that the patrons are having a good time. A small gun chase takes place and a passer-by is whacked on the head with what looks like a bottle of beer. Next, a really tall cowboy walks down the road but has the middle of his body shot out by the patrons. This results in him being reduced to the size of a midget.

Bosko arrives and his horse collapses in a heap beside the pavement. Strolling toward the saloon on the opposite side of the road, Bosko throws open the doors and yells "Howdy" only to be greeted by a volley of gunshots. The patrons yell "Hi Bosko" in return as Bosko laughs uneasily. He then picks up his bullet-riddled hat and walks inside where a three-piece band, comprising banjo, violin and piano, is playing "She'll Be Coming 'Round the Mountain". Bosko starts to tap dance whilst some onlookers sway to the beat.

The piano player thumps hard on the keys which makes a mug of beer fly through the air and empty the contents into his open mouth. He gulps it down and is suddenly consumed by flames that spread upwards from his feet. This results in his clothes being burnt off, exposing bloomers. He puckers a suddenly lipsticked mouth, crosses his knees in a shyly feminine fashion and walks away seductively.

Bosko steps up to the piano and starts to play, rocking his stool in tune to the music. Next, four cards are seen held in someone's hand: a King, Jack, Queen and Joker. They sing a little ditty but the person holding the cards soon shoots the Joker putting an end to their performance. Bosko is shown still playing the piano whilst the other patrons gather in a circle and start dancing.

The scene then cuts to show the following words
The Deadwood stage
         (free wheeling)

Honey (Bosko's sweetheart) is in a carriage that is hurtling down the highway with a big trunk on the roof. The ride is quite bumpy so Honey gets thrown around her seat a bit and exhorts the driver to be careful. A group of highwaymen are also on the move and one of them creep along behind a cliff to look for potential prey. He spots Honey's carriage and hastens back to his cronies who follow his lead. He then positions himself alongside the path of Honey's carriage and aims his guns. However, the carriage hurtles past at such a fast pace that the gunmen gets twisted around himself. Having unravelled he gets on his horse and gives chase along with his gang, all of them shooting non-stop. Eventually, the trunk on the roof of the carriage falls out and the clothes get out and start running away to avoid the hailstorm of bullets. A corset is seen literally 'flying' away.

Inside the carriage Honey is getting thrown about violently as the driver is flung off his perch and lands on a tall cactus. He slides down wincing as hundreds of thorns break off and lands on a skeleton of a bull. The skeleton suddenly comes to life and goes off at a gallop whilst the rider hangs on for dear life.

Back at the saloon, Bosko is still playing the piano when the driver stumbles in and relays the news. He then deflates and collapses dramatically into his pants as his hand grabs a mug of beer and pours it in after himself.

Bosko gets on his horse and gallops away to the rescue, the horse leaping noticeably effortlessly over the rocks he seemed to have trouble with earlier.

The bandits are still chasing the carriage and Honey leans out of a window and implores Bosko to save her. As Bosko continues to gallop after the run away carriage the scene pans out to show, from left to right, Hugh Harman, Norman Blackburn, and Rudy Ising watching the cartoon and adding sound effects. Ising asks how they can get Bosko to save Honey, Blackburn doesn't know, Ising says they have to do something, then Harman decides they should go home. This prompts everyone to exit, leaving Bosko in the lurch.

Reception
Steve Schneider's That's All, Folks! The Art of Warner Bros. Animation cites Ride Him, Bosko! as an example of the studio's "bare-bones elementary level" of quality, saying that the animators "simply pack it in for the night — and perhaps provide a comment on their own commitment to ingenuity."

Notes
This short includes the first ever live-action sequence in a Warner Bros. cartoon.
This was the final Looney Tunes cartoon to use "A Hot Time in the Old Town" as the opening theme music.
Although the cartoon ends with a cliffhanger, it is continued in the Happy Harmonies series in "Bosko's Parlor Pranks", where Bosko eventually gets to rescue Honey from the crazy gunmen.
This is the earliest-released Warner Bros. cartoon still under copyright. The copyright was renewed on January 11, 1961.

References

External links
 
 

1932 films
1932 animated films
1930s American animated films
1930s animated short films
1932 Western (genre) films
American black-and-white films
Films scored by Frank Marsales
Animated films about music and musicians
Films directed by Hugh Harman
Bosko films
Films set in the United States
Looney Tunes shorts
Western (genre) animated films
1930s English-language films